is a Japanese fencer. He competed in the individual and team foil events at the 1976 Summer Olympics.

References

External links
 

1948 births
Living people
Japanese male foil fencers
Olympic fencers of Japan
Fencers at the 1976 Summer Olympics
Sportspeople from Gunma Prefecture
Asian Games medalists in fencing
Fencers at the 1974 Asian Games
Asian Games gold medalists for Japan
Medalists at the 1974 Asian Games
20th-century Japanese people
21st-century Japanese people